Kerch Railway station is the main railway station of Kerch in Crimea, a territory recognized by a majority of countries as part of Ukraine, but de facto under control and administration of Russia.

Main information
The station can receive container shipments weighing up to 20 tons, and cargo, originating from ports of Kerch.
The station is the destination of passenger and commuter trains on the line Vladislavovka—Port Krym. On other lines (Kerch — Kerch-South and Kerch — Port Krym) passenger traffic was from 2010 to 2014.

History
The station opened in 1900 as Kerch-2.

In 1970 renamed Kerch.

From 1 August 2014 Russian Railways restored passenger traffic on the line Kerch — Port Krym (passenger train Simferopol — Rostov-on-Don — Moscow).

Trains
 Djankoy — Kerch
 Simferopol — Moscow (via Rostov-on-Don)
 Sevastopol — Kerch (only in summer)

Gallery

See also
 Crimean Bridge - rail link across Kerch Strait

References

External links
 Information
 Train times on Yandex

Railway stations in Crimea
Railway stations in the Russian Empire opened in 1900